Michael Soter is a State Representative who represents the 8th Worcester District in the Massachusetts House of Representatives. He represents the towns of Blackstone, Millville, Uxbridge,  and Bellingham. Soter serves as the Ranking Minority on the Joint Committee on Children, Families and Persons with Disabilities, and as a member of the Joint Committee on Economic Development and Emerging Technologies, the Joint Committee on Municipalities and Regional Government, and the Joint Committee on Public Health.

See also
 2019–2020 Massachusetts legislature
 2021–2022 Massachusetts legislature

References

Living people
21st-century American politicians
Republican Party members of the Massachusetts House of Representatives
People from Bellingham, Massachusetts
Year of birth missing (living people)